The Military Council for Justice and Democracy (CMJD) was a supreme political body of Mauritania. It served as the country's interim government following the coup d'état which ousted the President Maaouya Ould Sid'Ahmed Taya on 3 August 2005. It was led by the former director of the national police force, Colonel Ely Ould Mohamed Vall. After seizing power it quickly pledged to hold elections within two years, and promised that none of its own members would run. A few days after seizing power, Vall named Sidi Mohamed Ould Boubacar as Prime Minister following the resignation of Ould Taya's last Prime Minister, Sghair Ould M'Bareck.

A presidential election took place in March 2007 and the new President Sidi Ould Cheikh Abdallahi was sworn in on April 19, 2007.

Several members of CMJD later became members of the next Mauritanian junta, the High Council of State when it came to power in the 2008 Mauritanian coup d'état under the leadership of general Mohamed Ould Abdel Aziz.

Members

Col. Ely Ould Mohamed Vall, Chairman
Col. Abderrahmane Ould Boubacar
Col. Mohamed Ould Abdel Aziz
Col. Mohamed Ould Ghazouani
Col. Ahmed Ould Bekrine
Col. Sogho Alassane
Dr.-Col. Ghoulam Ould Mohamed
Col. Sidi Mohamed Ould Cheikh El Alem
Col. Negri Felix
Col. Mohamed Ould Meguett
Col. Mohamed Ould Mohamed Znagui
Dr.-Col. Kane Hamedine
Col. Mohamed Ould Abdi
Col. Ahmed Ould Ameine
Col. Taleb Moustapha Ould Cheikh
Col. Mohamed Cheikh Ould Mohamed Lemine
Naval Col. Isselkou Ould Cheikh El Wely

See also 
 Military Committee for National Recovery (CRMN) – Military government in 1978–79.
 Military Committee for National Salvation (CMSN) – Military government in 1979–92.
 High Council of State (HCE) – Military government in 2008–09.

References

External links
 Mauritania army says to rule country for 2 years – Reuters
 Oil wealth triggers army coup – Times Online.
 Mauritanian Military and Security Forces Overthrow Pro-Israel President, Ma'aouya Taya – Al Jazeera
 Mauritania seize of power 'not a surprise' and Jubilant Mauritanians celebrate end of Taya's rule – SABC
 US Envoy Meets Leaders of Mauritanian Junta and Mauritania Remains Calm After Military Coup – Voice of America
 Mauritanian coup leaders dissolve National Assembly and Int'l community intensifies pressure on Mauritanian coup leaders – Xinhua
 Govt continues despite coup and Coup leaders assure diplomats – News24.com
 Thousands Back Junta in Mauritania – The Guardian
African Union boycotts Mauritania after coup – The Globe and Mail

History of Mauritania
Politics of Mauritania
Government of Mauritania
Mauritania